Que te perdone Dios... yo no (English title: Ask God for Forgiveness... Not Me) is a Mexican telenovela produced by Angelli Nesma Medina for Televisa. It is the remake of the telenovela Abrázame muy fuerte, produced in 2000.

Zuria Vega, Mark Tacher and Rebecca Jones star as the protagonists, while Sergio Goyri, Sabine Moussier, Laisha Wilkins, and Altaír Jarabo star as the antagonists, with special participation of María Sorté and René Strickler.

Television film 
On July 18, 2015, Televisa confirmed that the soap opera would have a special one-hour, which debuted on July 25, 2015, under the title of ¡La historia que pudo haber sido!.

Plot 
This is the story of Renata Flores del Angel (Irán Castillo, Rebecca Jones), a young woman from a wealthy family who falls for Pablo Ramos (Brandon Peniche), the foreman of the estate of her father. She knows it's a relationship that her father, Don Bruno Flores Riquelme (Eric del Castillo), would never approve, but when he learns that Renata is in love with Pablo, he threatens to kill him, not knowing that Renata is already pregnant with Pablo's daughter. Bruno banishes Renata and Macaria Rios (Alejandra García), the servant, to Real de San Andres, (San Miguel de Allende), the Guanajuato capital, to have the baby there. By the management of Fausto López Guerra (Sergio Goyri), little Abigail (Zuria Vega) comes back to the hacienda as Macaria's daughter.

Years pass and Renata, in order to be with her daughter, is forced to marry Fausto, an ambitious and cruel man who claims to love her. From then on, she acts as Abigail's godmother. Fausto provokes an accident in which Renata tries to escape with Abigail, causing Renata to lose her eyesight, and also takes command of Renata's fortune. Fausto is happy about the arrival of his nephew Mateo (Mark Tacher) to the hacienda. He is a young, handsome, and daring man who has recently completed his studies of medicine overland from Canada.

Mateo falls in love with Diana Montero (Altaír Jarabo), without knowing that she is the lover of his uncle. When Fausto finds out about this relationship, he opposes it and separates Diana from his nephew. Meanwhile, from the moment she meets Mateo, Abigail falls in love with him; the two end up together, provoking hate in Diana who, along with Fausto, tries to separate the young couple. They achieve the separation of the two lovers, but they aren't able to destroy the love that Abigail and Mateo feel for each other.

Mateo finally has his teacher, friend, and specialist in ophthalmology review Renata's case of blindness to see if he can operate on her. Dr. Patricio Duarte (Rene Strickler) secretly falls in love with Renata and has a great interest in helping Renata recover her sight again. The two form a very special friendship and love despite Renata's marriage to Fausto.

Cast

Main cast 
Zuria Vega as Abigail Flores
Mark Tacher as Mateo Lopez Guerra Fuentes
Sergio Goyri as Fausto Lopez Guerra
Rebecca Jones as Renata Flores del Angel de Lopez Guerra
Sabine Moussier as Macaria Rios
Maria Sorte as Helena Fuentes 
Rene Strickler as Dr. Patricio Duarte
Altair Jarabo as Diana Montero

Also as main cast 

Ana Bertha Espín as Doña Constanza del Ángel de Flores
Ferdinando Valencia as Diego Múñoz
Alejandro Ávila as Lucio Ramírez
Manuel Ojeda as Melitón
Dacia González as Vicenta Múñoz
Zaide Silvia Gutiérrez as Simona Sánchez
Ana Patricia Rojo as Efigenia de la Cruz y Ferreria
Fabián Robles as Julio Acosta / Julián Montero
Laisha Wilkins as Ximena / Daniela 
Irán Castillo as Young Renata Flores del Ángel
Eric del Castillo as Don Bruno Flores Riquelme
Brandon Peniche as Pablo Ramos  
Alejandra Ávalos as Mía Montero 
Moisés Arizmendi as Porfirio Ramirez 
Antonio Medellín as Padre Francisco Ojeda Bernal
Alejandra García as Young Macaria Rios
Alejandra Procuna as Eduviges de la Cruz y Ferreria 
Raúl Olivo as Jaime Díaz "Motor"
Óscar Bonfiglio as Marcelino
Julio Mannino as Benito
Myrrha Saavedra as Amanda Rios
Carlos Athié as Maximiliano "Max" Ramírez Zarazúa 
Héctor Saez as Comandante Efrain Barragán
Adriano Zendejas as Antonio "Toño" Sánchez
Santiago Hernández as Alfredo "Fredy" Sánchez
Rafael Amador as Cantinero
Iván Caraza as Mano Negra
José María Galeano as Padre Tomás 
Alejandra Robles Gil as Teodora
Daniela Basso as Juanita
Lakshmi Picazo as Nieves

Special participation 
Ricardo Franco as Gerardo López Guerra
Erik Díaz as Young Fausto
Regina Blandón as Young Helena
Christian Vega as Young Lucio

Ratings

Univision rating 
Will premiere on 19 January 2015 on Univision with a total of 3.0 million viewers.

Mexico rating 
On Mexico will premiere February 16, 2015 with a total of 19.2 viewers.

Soundtrack

Awards and nominations

Broadcast 
The series originally aired from January 19, 2015 to July 10, 2015 on Univision. The series aired on Canal de las Estrellas from February 16, 2015 until July 27, 2015.

References

External links 

Televisa telenovelas
Mexican telenovelas
2015 telenovelas
2015 Mexican television series debuts
2015 Mexican television series endings
Spanish-language telenovelas